Yoav Galant (born 8 November 1958) is an Israeli politician currently serving as the Minister of Defense since 2022. He is a former commander of the Southern Command in the Israel Defense Forces. In January 2015, he entered politics, joining the new Kulanu party. After being elected to the Knesset, he was appointed Minister of Construction. At the end of 2018, he joined Likud. Galant also previously held the posts of Minister of Aliyah and Integration and Minister of Education.

Biography
Yoav Galant was born in Jaffa to Polish Jewish immigrants. His mother, Fruma, was a Holocaust survivor who had been on the SS Exodus as a child. Along with other Exodus refugees, she was deported by the British to Hamburg, and arrived in Israel in 1948. She was a nurse by profession His father, Michael, fought the Nazis as a partisan in the forests of Ukraine and Belarus, and also immigrated to Israel in 1948. He served in the Givati Brigade in the 1948 Arab–Israeli War, including the Samson's Foxes unit, and was considered one of the finest snipers in the IDF. He participated in Operation Yoav, during which he was the first soldier to break into the fort at Iraq Suwaydan. He named his son for the operation. In Galant's youth, the family moved to Givatayim, where he studied at David Kalai high school. He received a BA in Business and Finance Management from the University of Haifa.

Galant lives in Moshav Amikam. He is married to Claudine, a retired IDF lieutenant colonel. They have a son and two daughters.

In 2011, Galant was tapped to succeed Gabi Ashkenazi as the Chief of General Staff by Defense Minister Ehud Barak. Although his appointment was approved by the government it was overturned due to allegations of building of an unauthorized access road to his home and planting an olive grove on public land outside the boundaries of his property.

Military career
Galant began his military career in 1977 as a naval commando in Shayetet 13. In the 1980s, after six years of active service, he moved to Alaska and worked as a lumberjack. He then returned to the navy and served on a missile boat (including a position as deputy-commander of INS Keshet) and again in Shayetet 13. In 1992, Galant was earmarked by then-navy commander Ami Ayalon for the command of Shayetet 13, a position he was meant to take up in 1994. Galant preferred not to study during the two remaining years, and instead moved into the ground forces and in 1993 took up command of the Menashe Territorial Brigade of the West Bank Division.

After serving for three years as commander of Shayetet 13, Galant moved up to command the Gaza Division. He also commanded the reserve 340th Armored Division (Idan Formation), and in 2001 became the Chief of Staff of the GOC Army Headquarters. Galant attained the rank of a major general when he became the Military Secretary of the Prime Minister in 2002. In 2005, Galant was appointed as commander of the Southern Command. During his tenure (that lasted until 21 October 2010), the Israel Defense Forces embarked on Operation Cast Lead against Hamas in the Gaza Strip. Galant commanded the operation and his role in the field and in the success of the operation gained praise and helped him in the race to chief of staff.

The Israeli NGO, Yesh Gvul, filed suit against Galant's appointment as IDF chief of staff, claiming that his command role in Cast Lead confirmed him as a suspect in "grave violations of international law." Haaretz noted that Galant lobbied against an investigation of Col. Ilan Malka, the IDF commander who approved the airstrike that killed 21 members of the al-Samouni clan during Cast Lead. Galant's view was ignored as the military prosecutor general opened an investigation of the incident which was highlighted by the Goldstone Report (since disavowed by its author) as a possible serious breach of international law.

Chief of Staff candidacy

On 22 August 2010, Minister of Defense Ehud Barak presented the candidacy of Galant for the post of the IDF's twentieth Chief of Staff to the government. It was expected that he would receive the promotion. Galant's appointment followed a controversy, where a forged document was transferred to Israel's Channel 2 which accused Galant of attempting to smear rival candidate Benny Gantz.

On 5 September 2010, the government approved the nomination of Yoav Galant as the next chief of staff, with only Likud minister Michael Eitan objecting. Prime Minister Benjamin Netanyahu said that the incoming IDF chief has "proven his worth during his 33 years of military service at the IDF's frontlines," and that "He's proven himself to be a courageous fighter, an excellent officer, and a responsible and serious battle commander." The PM added that Galant picked up on a legacy of "dedication and excellence" bequeathed by incumbent IDF chief Gabi Ashkenazi. The cabinet also approved Barak's proposal, according to which Galant would serve for three years, giving the defense minister power to grant a fourth.

On 1 February 2011, Prime Minister Benjamin Netanyahu and Defense Minister Ehud Barak canceled the appointment of Galant to the post of Israel Defense Forces chief. The announcement came after months of scandal surrounding his appointment due to allegations that he had seized public lands near his home in Moshav Amikam. After conducting an investigation into the allegations, Attorney General Yehuda Weinstein said that his findings "raise significant legal difficulties for the decision to appoint him." Weinstein said that it was up to the prime minister and defense minister to decide whether or not Galant could take up the post as new IDF chief of staff. Earlier in the day, Weinstein notified Prime Minister Benjamin Netanyahu that he could not defend Galant's appointment as chief of staff due to legal impediments.

On 30 December 2012, the local planning committee administrating land ownership issues and building licenses said that Galant had built his home in the northern community of Amikam on 350m² of property accidentally listed as his, unaware that it was actually public land. The decision didn't address two other issues still being investigated by the state comptroller and attorney general: the building of an unauthorized access road to his house and the planting of an olive grove that spilled over the boundaries of his property.

Political career

Kulanu
In January 2015 Galant joined the new Kulanu party. He was placed second on the party's list for the 2015 elections, and was elected to the Knesset as the party won ten seats. He was later appointed Minister of Construction in the new government.

In January 2016, the New York Times published an op-ed by Galant in which he describes how important he believes it is for Jewish and Arab leaders to come together in promoting peace and equality in their shared country. As part of that effort, he and MK Ayman Odeh, leader of the Joint List alliance of Arab parties, together visited several Arab Israeli towns. "Together, we examined firsthand the challenges facing Arab Israeli communities so that we could bring about solutions," he notes.

Likud
On 31 December 2018, Galant quit his post as Housing and Construction Minister to join Likud. A day later he was appointed Minister of Aliyah and Integration. He resigned from the Knesset and was replaced by the next candidate on the Kulanu list, Fentahun Seyoum on 2 January 2019.

As a Likud member Galant was appointed Minister of Aliyah and Integration. After the formation of the Thirty-fifth government of Israel Galant was appointed Minister of Education.

On 17 January 2021, reacting to a planned speech by director-general of B'Tselem Hagai El-Ad at the Hebrew Reali School, Galant, serving as the Minister of Education, published a directive to the Education Ministry to forbid all organizations whose causes contradict the Ministry's vision of the country as democratic, Jewish and Zionist, from entering schools.
Specifically, Galant wrote, any organization which cites Israel as an "apartheid state", shall be forbidden from entering education centers in Israel.

In 2021, as Minister of Education, Galant opposed Weizmann Institute professor Oded Goldreich receiving the Israel Prize in mathematics, due to him co-signing a 2019 letter that called for the German Parliament not to pass legislation defining the Boycott, Divestment and Sanctions (BDS) movement as anti-Semitic.  On 8 April 2021 Israel's Supreme Court of Justice ruled in favor of Galant's petition so that Goldreich cannot receive the prize this year and gave Galant a month to further examine the issue.

References

External links

1958 births
Living people
20th-century Israeli military personnel
21st-century Israeli military personnel
Israeli generals
Israeli Jews
Israeli people of Polish-Jewish descent
Jewish Israeli politicians
Kulanu politicians
Likud politicians
Members of the 20th Knesset (2015–2019)
Members of the 21st Knesset (2019)
Members of the 22nd Knesset (2019–2020)
Members of the 23rd Knesset (2020–2021)
Members of the 24th Knesset (2021–2022)
Members of the 25th Knesset (2022–)
People from Jaffa
People named in the Panama Papers
University of Haifa alumni